Rajeshwari Chatterjee (24 January 1922 – 3 September 2010) was an Indian scientist and an academic. She was the first woman engineer from Karnataka. During her tenure at the Indian Institute of Science (IISc), Bangalore, Chatterjee was a professor and later chairperson of the department of Electrical Communication Engineering.

Early life and education 
Chatterjee was born in 1922 in Karnataka. She had her primary education in a "special English school" founded by her grandmother, Kamalamma Dasappa, one of the first women graduates from Mysore and who was very active in the field of education especially those of widows and deserted wives. After her school finals, she was tempted to take up History but eventually chose physics and mathematics. She studied in Central College of Bangalore and earned B.Sc. (Hons) and M.Sc. degrees in mathematics. In both these exams she ranked first in the Mysore University. She received Mummadi Krishnaraja Wodeyar Award and M.T. Narayana Iyengar Prize and the Walters Memorial Prize respectively for her performances in the B.Sc. and M.Sc. examinations.

In 1943, after her M.Sc., she joined the Indian Institute of Science(IISc), Bangalore as a Research Student in the then Electrical Technology Department in the area of Communication.

She went to C.V. Raman to work under him. Some sources say that Raman refused to take her stating that Rajeshwari had no degrees in physics  while others say that he was averse to the idea of having women students.

After the Second World War, an interim government was set up in India to transfer power from the British to Indians, which offered scholarships to bright young scientists to study abroad. She applied for one such scholarship in the field of electronics and its applications, and in 1946, she was selected as a "bright student" by the Government of Delhi and was given a scholarship to go abroad to pursue higher studies and she chose to study in University of Michigan, Ann Arbor in the United States. In the 1950s it was very difficult for Indian women to go abroad to pursue higher education. But Chatterjee was determined to do so. In July 1947, one month before India's independence, she started her journey to the USA on a converted troop ship SS Marine Adder and reached there after 30 days. In the US, she was admitted to the University of Michigan and obtained her master's degree from the Department of Electrical Engineering. Then following the guidelines of the contract she had with the Government of India, she underwent an eight months' practical training in the Division of Radio Frequency Measurements at the National Bureau of Standards in Washington D.C. After the completion of the training she went back to the University of Michigan in 1949 on a Barbour scholarship and resumed her studies. In early 1953 she obtained her Ph.D. degree under the guidance of Professor William Gould Dow and successfully completed her dissertation.

Career in India 
In 1953, after obtaining her PhD degree, she returned to India and became a faculty member at the IISc Department of Electrical Communication Engineering, later saying that she taught "electromagnetic theory, electron tube circuits, microwave technology, and radio engineering". That same year, she married Sisir Kumar Chatterjee, who was a faculty member of the same college. After their marriage, she and her husband built a microwave research laboratory and began research in the field of Microwave Engineering, the first such research in India.

In the same period, Chatterjee was selected for the position of chairman in the Department of Electrical Communication Engineering. Over her lifetime, she mentored 20 PhD students, wrote over 100 research papers, and authored seven books.

Following her retirement from the IISc in 1982, she worked on social programs, including the Indian Association for Women's Studies.

Books 
 Elements of Microwave Engineering
 Antenna Theory And Practice
 A Thousand Streams: A Personal History
 Dielectric And Dielectric Loaded Antennas
 Advanced Microwave Engineering: Special Advanced Topics
 Vasudhaiva Kutumbakam: The Whole World Is But One Family: Real Stories of Some Women and Men of India
 Antennas for Information Super Skyways: An Exposition on Outdoor and Indoor Wireless Antenna, co-authored by Perambur S. Neelakanta

Personal life 
Rajeshwari's father, B.M.Shivaramajah, was an advocate in Nanjangud. Her grandmother, Kamalamma Dasappa, was one of the first women graduates in the erstwhile state of Mysore. Rajeswari married Sisir Kumar Chatterjee, a faculty of IISc in 1953. The couple had a daughter Indira Chatterjee, who is now a professor of electrical and biomedical engineering at the University of Nevada, Reno, U.S.

Awards 
For her contribution and works in the field of Microwave engineering, she won many awards. Some of the notable awards and honours are—
 Mummadi Krishnaraja Wodeyar Award for first rank in the BSc (Hons)
 M T Narayana Iyengar prize and the Waters Memorial prize for the first rank in M.Sc.
 Mountbatten prize for the best paper from the Institute of Electrical and Radio Engineering (UK)
 J.C Bose Memorial prize for the best research paper from the Institution of Engineers
 Ramlal Wadhwa Award for the best research and teaching work from the Institute of Electronics and Telecommunication Engineers.

References 

1922 births
2010 deaths
Articles created or expanded during Women's History Month (India) - 2014
Indian women engineers
Indian women academics
Bengali physicists
University of Mysore alumni
University of Michigan College of Engineering alumni
20th-century Indian women scientists
Engineers from Karnataka
Microwave transmission
Indian women physicists
Indian Institute of Science alumni
20th-century Indian physicists
Women scientists from Karnataka
Women educators from Karnataka
20th-century women engineers
Indian expatriates in the United States